Ergin Keleş (born 1 January 1987) is a Turkish professional footballer who plays for Kastamonuspor 1966.

Career
Keleş started his footballing career with local club Trabzonspor in 1999. The Black Sea club kept Keleş on the books for ten years, where Keleş spent most of his time with the youth teams. He spent time on loan with Akçaabat Sebatspor and Sakaryaspor before being transferred to Manisaspor. He joined MKE Ankaragücü in January 2011. Then he moved to Kardemir Karabükspor on 31 January 2012.

He returned to Adanaspor in 2020.

References

External links
 
 Soccerway Profile
 TFF Profile

1987 births
Sportspeople from Trabzon
Living people
Turkish footballers
Turkey youth international footballers
Turkey under-21 international footballers
Association football forwards
Trabzonspor footballers
Akçaabat Sebatspor footballers
Sakaryaspor footballers
Manisaspor footballers
MKE Ankaragücü footballers
Kardemir Karabükspor footballers
Mersin İdman Yurdu footballers
Göztepe S.K. footballers
Adanaspor footballers
Gaziantep F.K. footballers
Sivasspor footballers
Giresunspor footballers
Akhisarspor footballers
Altay S.K. footballers
Ankara Demirspor footballers
Süper Lig players
TFF First League players
TFF Second League players